Searsport is an incorporated town and deep water seaport located at the confluence of the Penobscot River estuary and the Penobscot Bay immediately NW of Sears Island and Cape Jellison in Waldo County, Maine, United States. The population was 2,649 at the 2020 census. Searsport includes the village of North Searsport. The town is known as "the home of the famous sea captains" and the "Antique Capital of Maine".

History

Searsport was settled in the 1760s and incorporated on February 13, 1845 from portions of Prospect and Belfast. In 1747, when fire destroyed the Province House in Boston, General Samuel Waldo advocated, unsuccessfully, that the capital of Massachusetts be moved to Searsport, which was part of the Waldo Patent he purchased about 1720. It was named after David Sears of Boston after he agreed to grant a large sum of money towards the town's founding. Searsport is noted for its rich maritime history. During the 19th-century the port had 17 shipyards and built 200 ships, while supplying fully one-tenth of the nation's merchant marine deep water captains, per square mile more than any other community in the United States. The Penobscot Marine Museum faithfully recalls this heritage.

Port facilities

Searsport is Maine's second largest deep water port and is ideally located from the point of view of railroad, wood products and other development interests. Indeed, the town became the Penobscot Bay shipping terminus for the Northern Maine Seaport Railroad, a line opened in 1905 by the Bangor and Aroostook Railroad, which sent potatoes, timber and other products from here by boat, and loaded coal for use by its locomotives, without having to arrange rates with the Maine Central Railroad. Tracks running along either side of the pier can hold 24 railcars on the west side and twelve cars on the east side. The Searsport railway yard can hold 700 cars. The port facilities at Searsport were a preferred loading point for ammunition during World War II.

Geography

Situated on Penobscot Bay, Searport is drained by Long Cove Brook and Mill Brook.

The town is crossed by U. S. Route 1 and Maine State Route 3. It borders the towns of Prospect and Stockton Springs to the northeast, Belfast to the southwest, Swanville to the northwest, and Frankfort to the north.

Demographics

2010 census

As of the census of 2010, there were 2,615 people, 1,186 households, and 715 families residing in the town. The racial makeup of the town was 97.2% White, 0.5% African American, 0.8% Native American, 0.1% Asian, 0.2% Pacific Islander, and 1.2% from two or more races. Hispanic or Latino of any race were 0.9% of the population.

There were 1,186 households, of which 24.5% had children under the age of 18 living with them, 43.5% were married couples living together, 12.0% had a female householder with no husband present, 4.8% had a male householder with no wife present, and 39.7% were non-families. 32.3% of all households were made up of individuals, and 15.5% had someone living alone who was 65 years of age or older. The average household size was 2.20 and the average family size was 2.73.

The median age in the town was 46.9 years. 19% of residents were under the age of 18; 6.5% were between the ages of 18 and 24; 22.2% were from 25 to 44; 33.5% were from 45 to 64; and 19% were 65 years of age or older. The gender makeup of the town was 47.7% male and 52.3% female.

2000 census

As of the census of 2000, there were 2,641 people, 1,130 households, and 732 families residing in the town. The racial makeup of the town was 98.07% White, 0.27% Black or African American, 0.72% Native American, 0.08% from other races, and 0.87% from two or more races. Hispanic or Latino of any race were 0.19% of the population.

There were 1,130 households, out of which 27.6% had children under the age of 18 living with them, 51.2% were married couples living together, 10.0% had a female householder with no husband present, and 35.2% were non-families. 28.7% of all households were made up of individuals, and 13.4% had someone living alone who was 65 years of age or older.  The average household size was 2.34 and the average family size was 2.86.

In the town, the population was spread out, with 23.3% under the age of 18, 7.2% from 18 to 24, 25.7% from 25 to 44, 28.6% from 45 to 64, and 15.2% who were 65 years of age or older.  The median age was 41 years. For every 100 females, there were 91.4 males.  For every 100 females age 18 and over, there were 87.1 males.

The median income for a household in the town was $31,288, and the median income for a family was $38,333. Males had a median income of $31,629 versus $23,221 for females. The per capita income for the town was $18,883.  About 11.3% of families and 13.4% of the population were below the poverty line, including 19.0% of those under age 18 and 11.0% of those age 65 or over.

Government

Searsport's government is organized around a town meeting system and is characteristic of a New England town, with an annual town meeting held every March and special town meetings held at various times during the year. A five-member Board of Selectmen (with its members serving three-year terms) is elected on the Tuesday before the annual meeting and it, along with the Town Manager, run the town's daily affairs, including overseeing town water, sewage treatment, law enforcement, fire protection, emergency medical service, recreational programs and a library.  They may not pass a budget or most ordinances without town approval at the annual or a special town meeting.  The town does not have a mayor, but the Board of Selectmen does choose a Chair who is responsible for running the Board's meetings and who is considered the chief executive officer for the town.

Notable people 

 Phineas Banning Blanchard, sea captain and maritime industry leader; resided and buried in Searsport (born at sea)
 Henry Chadwick, journalist
 Joanna Carver Colcord, writer, social work pioneer
 Roswell K. Colcord, 7th governor of Nevada; born in Searsport
 Lincoln Ross Colcord, author, journalist
 Peter A. Garland, US congressman, town manager of Searsport
 Sam Houston, bodyguard for George Washington
 Matthew Kenney, celebrity chef, raised in Searsport
 Freeman McGilvery, army officer
 Marlboro Packard, master shipbuilder
 Ephraim K. Smart, US congressman; born in Searsport
 Frederick Stevens, U.S. Representative from Minnesota; raised in Searsport

Sites of interest

 Moose Point State Park
 Sears Island
 Union School
 Penobscot Marine Museum
 Cape Jellison

References

External links

 
 Town of Searsport, Maine
 Carver Memorial Library
 Penobscot Marine Museum
 Maine Genealogy: Searsport, Waldo County, Maine
 Moose Point State Park

 
Towns in Waldo County, Maine
Populated coastal places in Maine